The following is an incomplete list of music festivals that feature electronic music, which encapsulates music featuring electronic instruments such as electric guitar and keyboards, as well as recent genres such as electronic dance music (EDM). Many of the festivals in this list take place in the United States and Europe, though every year thousands of electronic-focused music festivals are held throughout the world. This list generally excludes multi-genre festivals with only a partial focus on electronic music (Glastonbury, Summer Sonic Festival, and Big Day Out) and festivals that have added EDM stages in later years.

Since the early 1900s there have been music festivals that featured electronic instruments, as electronic sounds were used in experimental music such as electroacoustic and tape music. The use of live electronic music greatly expanded in the 1950s, along with the use of electric guitar and bass. With the advent of new technologies in the 1960s, electronic genres such as electronic rock, electronic jazz, disco, computer music, synthpop, psychedelic rock and ambient music followed, with large free festivals showcasing the sounds into the 1970s. There has been a significant change in the capabilities of amplifiers, sequencers, and mixing synthesizers since 1980, as well as computers and digital audio workstations. This has given electronic musicians and DJs the ability to mix elaborate and complicated music in forms such as techno, electronica, trance, house or industrial, all of which have large festivals, raves, technoparades, algoraves, doofs, or teknivals in their sole dedication.

Related lists, categories, and media

Festivals by debut year

1800s–1950s: Electroacoustics

1960s: Rock and pop festivals
See list of historic rock festivals for a more comprehensive list of early rock/pop festivals, detailing live psychedelic rock, electronic rock and nu jazz in the 1960s and 1970s, all of which feature electronic elements.

1970s: Computer music

1980s: Birth of techno

1990s: Genre proliferation

1990–1994

1995–1997

1998–1999

2000s: Growth of commercial raves

2000–2002

2003–2004

2005–2006

2007–2009

2010s: The rise of EDM

2010–2012

2013–2014

2015–

See also

Lists
List of music festivals
List of electronic dance music festivals
List of music festivals in the United Kingdom#Dance & Electronic

Categories
:Category:Electronic music festivals
:Category:Electronic music festivals by type
:Category:Electronic music festivals by country

History, genres, and craft
History of electronic music
Timeline of electronic music genres
Live electronic music
Live PA
Disc jockey

References

Articles containing video clips